Darren Crocker (born 26 March 1967) is a former Australian rules footballer who is currently the coach of the  AFL Women's team. He formerly played for the North Melbourne Football Club in the Australian Football League (AFL).

Playing career
Crocker played in the 1996 AFL Grand Final against the Sydney Swans.

Coaching career
On 16 June 2009, he was appointed caretaker senior coach of the North Melbourne Football Club after the resignation of Dani Laidley. On 17 August 2009 the North Melbourne Football Club appointed Brad Scott as their senior coach, thus Crocker was not retained as North Melbourne coach for the 2010 season. However, he remained as assistant coach at North Melbourne Football Club. In 2015, Crocker again served as acting coach when Scott underwent back surgery, and again for one match in 2016 when Scott was ill.

On 4 June 2020, Crocker was appointed as coach of the  AFL Women's side, following the departure of inaugural coach Scott Gowans.

Personal life
He is married with four children.

Statistics

Playing statistics

|-
|- style="background-color: #EAEAEA"
! scope="row" style="text-align:center" | 1985
|style="text-align:center;"|
| 49 || 13 || 8 || 6 || 111 || 62 || 173 || 49 ||  || 0.6 || 0.5 || 8.5 || 4.8 || 13.3 || 3.8 ||  || 0
|-
! scope="row" style="text-align:center" | 1986
|style="text-align:center;"|
| 14 || 11 || 8 || 4 || 94 || 45 || 139 || 43 ||  || 0.7 || 0.4 || 8.5 || 4.1 || 12.6 || 3.9 ||  || 0
|- style="background-color: #EAEAEA"
! scope="row" style="text-align:center" | 1987
|style="text-align:center;"|
| 27 || 15 || 11 || 5 || 177 || 74 || 251 || 59 || 29 || 0.7 || 0.3 || 11.8 || 4.9 || 16.7 || 3.9 || 1.9 || 7
|-
! scope="row" style="text-align:center" | 1988
|style="text-align:center;"|
| 27 || 4 || 0 || 2 || 36 || 14 || 50 || 11 || 2 || 0.0 || 0.5 || 9.0 || 3.5 || 12.5 || 2.8 || 0.5 || 0
|- style="background-color: #EAEAEA"
! scope="row" style="text-align:center" | 1989
|style="text-align:center;"|
| 27 || 9 || 12 || 5 || 75 || 34 || 109 || 37 || 14 || 1.3 || 0.6 || 8.3 || 3.8 || 12.1 || 4.1 || 1.6 || 0
|-
! scope="row" style="text-align:center" | 1990
|style="text-align:center;"|
| 27 || 14 || 5 || 11 || 154 || 60 || 214 || 43 || 18 || 0.4 || 0.8 || 11.0 || 4.3 || 15.3 || 3.1 || 1.3 || 8
|- style="background-color: #EAEAEA"
! scope="row" style="text-align:center" | 1991
|style="text-align:center;"|
| 27 || 15 || 4 || 3 || 147 || 73 || 220 || 56 || 10 || 0.3 || 0.2 || 9.8 || 4.9 || 14.7 || 3.7 || 0.7 || 2
|-
! scope="row" style="text-align:center" | 1992
|style="text-align:center;"|
| 27 || 22 || 16 || 15 || 290 || 141 || 431 || 82 || 32 || 0.7 || 0.7 || 13.2 || 6.4 || 19.6 || 3.7 || 1.5 || 3
|- style="background-color: #EAEAEA"
! scope="row" style="text-align:center" | 1993
|style="text-align:center;"|
| 27 || 14 || 10 || 10 || 152 || 61 || 213 || 47 || 26 || 0.7 || 0.7 || 10.9 || 4.4 || 15.2 || 3.4 || 2.3 || 0
|-
! scope="row" style="text-align:center" | 1994
|style="text-align:center;"|
| 27 || 14 || 7 || 3 || 128 || 98 || 226 || 50 || 15 || 0.5 || 0.2 || 9.1 || 7.0 || 16.1 || 3.6 || 1.1 || 4
|- style="background-color: #EAEAEA"
! scope="row" style="text-align:center" | 1995
|style="text-align:center;"|
| 27 || 3 || 5 || 1 || 17 || 10 || 27 || 9 || 4 || 1.7 || 0.3 || 5.7 || 3.3 || 9.0 || 3.0 || 1.3 || 0
|-
|style="text-align:center;background:#afe6ba;"|1996†
|style="text-align:center;"|
| 27 || 15 || 20 || 15 || 94 || 29 || 123 || 42 || 15 || 1.3 || 1.0 || 6.3 || 1.9 || 8.2 || 2.8 || 1.0 || 4
|- style="background-color: #EAEAEA"
! scope="row" style="text-align:center" | 1997
|style="text-align:center;"|
| 27 || 9 || 10 || 4 || 25 || 14 || 39 || 6 || 4 || 1.1 || 0.4 || 3.1 || 2.9 || 6.0 || 1.1 || 0.7 || 0
|- class="sortbottom"
! colspan=3| Career
! 165
! 119
! 90
! 1522
! 735
! 2257
! 542
! 174
! 0.7
! 0.5
! 9.2
! 4.5
! 13.7
! 3.3
! 1.2
! 28
|}

Coaching statistics

|- style="background-color: #EAEAEA"
! scope="row" style="text-align:center; font-weight:normal" | 2009
|style="text-align:center;"|
| 10 || 3 || 6 || 1 || 35.0% || 13 || 16
|-
! scope="row" style="text-align:center; font-weight:normal" | 2015
|style="text-align:center;"|
| 4 || 2 || 2 || 0 || 50.0% ||  || 
|- style="background-color: #EAEAEA"
! scope="row" style="text-align:center; font-weight:normal" | 2016
|style="text-align:center;"|
| 1 || 1 || 0 || 0 || 100.0% ||  || 
|- class="sortbottom"
! colspan=2| Career totals
! 15
! 6
! 8
! 1
! 43.3%
! colspan=2|
|}

References

External links

1967 births
Living people
North Melbourne Football Club players
North Melbourne Football Club Premiership players
North Melbourne Football Club coaches
Port Melbourne Football Club coaches
Australian rules footballers from Victoria (Australia)
One-time VFL/AFL Premiership players